Haunted Heart is an album by the American jazz bassist Charlie Haden's Quartet West recorded in 1991 and released on the Verve label.

Reception 
The Allmusic review by Ron Wynn awarded the album 4½ stars, stating, "Quartet West has emerged as a premier small combo, and Haden nicely paid tribute to the past without being held hostage to it".

Track listing
 Introduction (Max Steiner / Adolph Deutsch) - 0:37 
 "Hello My Lovely" (Haden) - 6:47 
 "Haunted Heart" (Howard Dietz, Arthur Schwartz) - 9:12 
 "Dance of the Infidels" (Bud Powell) - 3:50 
 "The Long Goodbye" (Alan Broadbent) - 6:30 
 "Moonlight Serenade" (Glenn Miller, Mitchell Parish) - 9:08 
 "Lennie's Pennies" (Lennie Tristano) - 5:15 
 "Ev'ry Time We Say Goodbye" (Cole Porter) - 4:18 
 "Lady in the Lake" (Broadbent) - 6:09 
 "Segment" (Charlie Parker) - 5:32 
 "The Bad and the Beautiful" (David Raksin) - 5:32 
 "Deep Song" (Douglass Cross, George Cory) - 6:05

Personnel
Charlie Haden – bass
Ernie Watts - tenor saxophone
Alan Broadbent - piano
Larance Marable - drums
Billie Holiday (track 12), Jo Stafford (track 3), Jeri Southern (track 8) - vocals

References 

Verve Records albums
Charlie Haden albums
1992 albums